Oeonosia longistriga is a moth of the family Erebidae first described by George Thomas Bethune-Baker in 1908. It is found in Papua New Guinea. The habitat consists of mountainous areas.

References

Lithosiina
Moths described in 1908